Mass shootings are incidents involving multiple victims of firearm-related violence. Definitions vary, with no single, broadly accepted definition. One definition is an act of public firearm violence—excluding gang killings, domestic violence, or terrorist acts sponsored by an organization—in which a shooter kills at least four victims. Using this definition, one study found that nearly one-third of the world's public mass shootings between 1966 and 2012 (90 of 292 incidents) occurred in the United States, The New York Times recorded the same total of mass shootings for that span of years. Using a similar definition, The Washington Post recorded 163 mass shootings in the United States between 1967 and June 2019. Mother Jones recorded 140 mass shootings between 1982 and February 2023. The Associated Press recorded 59 mass shootings between 2006 and August 2022. The Violence Project of the National Institute of Justice recorded 185 mass shootings from 1966 to December 2022. The Federal Bureau of Investigation designated 61 events as active shooter incidents in 2021.

The United States has had more mass shootings than any other country. Shooters generally either die by suicide afterward, or are restrained or killed by law enforcement officers. Mass shootings accounted for under 0.2 percent of gun deaths in the United States between 2000 and 2016.

Definitions

There is no fixed definition of a mass shooting in the United States, and different researchers define "mass shootings" in different ways. Among the various definitions are those that are:

 Based on injuries:

 Gun Violence Archive: More broadly defines "mass shooting" to mean four or more (excluding the perpetrator) shot at roughly the same time and location, regardless of number of fatalities or the motive. Brady: United Against Gun Violence uses a similar definition.

 Mass Shooting Tracker: Defines "mass shooting" as "an incident where four or more people are shot in a single shooting spree," including the perpetrator or police shootings of civilians around the perpetrator, and irrespective of the motive of the perpetrator or the location of the murders.

 Based on number of deaths:

 Investigative Assistance for Violent Crimes Act of 2012, signed into law in January 2013: Defines a "mass killing" as the killing of at least three victims, excluding the perpetrator, and regardless of the weapon used.

 Everytown for Gun Safety, which tracks mass shootings based on press accounts, police records, and court papers, defines mass shooting as "any incident in which four or more people are shot and killed, excluding the shooter."

 Based on number of deaths and nature of attack:

 Congressional Research Service (CRS) 2015 report titled Mass Murder with Firearms: Did not define "mass shooting" but defined "public mass shooting" for the purposes of its report as "a multiple homicide incident in which four or more victims are murdered with firearms, within one event, and in one or more locations in close proximity." The CRS further states that its report "attempts to refine the relatively broad concept of mass shooting...into a narrower formulation: public mass shootings."

 Mother Jones's open-source database of mass shootings: The magazine's database, established after the 2012 Aurora movie theater massacre and updated continuously since that time, defines "mass shootings" as "indiscriminate rampages in public places resulting in four or more victims killed by the attacker," excluding "shootings stemming from more conventionally motivated crimes such as armed robbery or gang violence" and shootings in which the perpetrator has not been identified. This definition generally is consistent with the FBI's figures and the data used by criminologists.

 2022 National Institute of Justice/The Violence Project dataset: Defines "mass public shooting" as an incident in which at least four victims were killed with firearms in a single event "and the murders are not attributable to any other underlying criminal activity or commonplace circumstance (armed robbery, criminal competition, insurance fraud, argument, or romantic triangle)."

The appropriateness of a broad versus narrow definition of "mass shooting" has been the subject of debate. Some commentators argue in favor of a narrow definition of mass shootings that excludes the victims of street crime. Mark Follman of Mother Jones, which compiles an open-source database of mass shootings, contends that "While all the victims are important, conflating those many other crimes with indiscriminate slaughter in public venues obscures our understanding of this complicated and growing problem." Northeastern University criminologist James Alan Fox argues against the use of the broad definition of "mass shooting" in the popular press, stating that it misleads readers. Others, by contrast, argue that defining "mass shooting" solely as a shooting in a public place in which the perpetrator fires at random is too narrow. For example, Mark Hay argues that although gang, party, and domestic violence "probably warrant different solutions" than random mass public shootings, a narrow definition fails "to capture and convey the full scope of large-scale gun violence in the United States" and its effect on marginalized communities.

Frequency and locations

Some studies indicate that the rate at which public mass shootings occur has tripled since 2011. Between 1982 and 2011, a mass shooting occurred roughly once every 200 days. However, between 2011 and 2014, that rate has accelerated greatly with at least one mass shooting occurring every 64 days in the United States.

Under the definition used by the Gun Violence Archive, by the end of 2019, there were 417 mass shootings; by the end of 2020, there had been 611; and by the end of 2021, 693. By mid-May 2021, there were 10 mass shootings per week on average; by mid-May 2022, there was a total of 198 mass shootings in the first 19 weeks of the year, which represents 11 mass shootings a week. The FBI designated 61 "active shooter" incidents (defined as "one or more individuals actively engaged in killing or attempting to kill people in a populated area"). There were ten mass shootings in 2019, two in 2020, and six in 2021. Under the substantially narrower 2022 National Institute of Justice/The Violence Project dataset definition, there were 167 mass shootings (4 or more killed with firearms in public, not connected to "underlying criminal activity or commonplace circumstance") in the U.S. from 1966 to 2019, and 30.8% of the shootings occurred at the workplace. 

In 2014, the Federal Bureau of Investigation conducted a review of 160 active shooter incidents in the U.S. from 2000 to 2013 (averaging approximately 11 cases annually) in 40 states and the District of Columbia. The study found that 45.6% took place in a business or commercial setting, 16.9% occurred in schools, 7.5% in institutions of higher education, 9.4% in open spaces, 6.9% in (non-military) government properties, 3.1% in military sites, 4.4% in homes, 3.8% in places of worship, and 2.5% in healthcare settings. FBI data shows that active shooter incidents increased from 2000 to 2019.

A comprehensive report by USA Today tracked all mass killings from 2006 through 2017 in which the perpetrator willfully killed four or more people. For mass killings by firearm for instance, it found 271 incidents with a total of 1,358 victims.

Under the Everytown for Gun Safety definition ("any incident in which four or more people are shot and killed, excluding the shooter") there were an average of 19 mass shootings in the U.S. each year from 2009 to 2020, with 947 wounded by gunfire and 1,363 fatally shot. The report found that: "In nearly all mass shootings over this period, the shooter was an adult man who acted alone. Thirty-two percent of mass shooters, or 92 shooters, ended with the perpetrator dying by suicide, and another 24 shooters were killed by responding law enforcement. The remaining 145 mass shooters were taken into custody by law enforcement, while the outcomes and identities of 23 remain unknown."

In October 2018, PLOS One published a study analyzing 100 mass shootings from the Mother Jones database that occurred from January 1982 to May 2018 that used non-homogeneous Poisson regression models on the biannual and annual incidence of mass shootings in the United States to evaluate whether mass shootings became more common in the United States over the preceding three decades that found that mass shootings had steadily increased (with the biannual incidence model having a better goodness of fit value based upon Akaike information criterion than the annual incidence model). However, some researchers dispute whether the frequency of mass shootings are increasing due to differences in research methods and differences in the criteria used to define events as mass shootings.

Perpetrator demographics

According to The New York Times, there is no common profile of people who carry out mass shootings in the United States, except that they are mostly men. By race, according to a study, the proportion of mass shooters in the United States who are white is about equal to the overall proportion of white people in the general population of the US. According to the same study, Asians are overrepresented in mass shootings, having perpetrated 6.06% of attacks despite being 5.7% of the population. The proportion of male mass shooters is considerably larger than the proportion of males in the general population. According to the Associated Press, white men comprise nearly 50 percent of all mass shooters in the US. According to the National Institute of Justice/The Violence project study, the demographics of shooters were 97.7% male, with an average age of 34.1 years, 52.3% white, 20.9% black, 8.1% latino, 6.4% asian, 4.2% middle eastern, and 1.8% native American.

According to the Center for Inquiry, mass shootings of family members (the most common) are usually carried out by white, middle-aged males. Felony-related mass shootings (connected with a previous crime) tend to be committed by young Black or Hispanic males with extensive criminal records, typically against people of the same ethnic group. Public mass shootings of persons unrelated to the shooter, and for a reason not connected with a previous crime (the rarest but most publicized) are committed by men whose racial distribution closely matches that of the nation as a whole. Other than gender, the demographic profiles of public mass shooters are too varied to draw firm conclusions. In its 2014 active shooter incidents review, the FBI found that the perpetrator was female in only 6 of the 160 incidents (4%) and that in only 2 incidents (1%) was there more than one perpetrator. Analogously, in December 2013, the Journal of Forensic Sciences published a sociodemographic network characteristics and antecedent behaviors survey of 119 lone-actor terrorists in the United States and Europe that found that 96.6 percent were male.

Contributing factors

High access to guns

Higher accessibility and ownership of guns has been cited as a reason for the U.S.'s high rate of mass shootings. The US has the highest per-capita gun ownership in the world with 120.5 firearms per 100 people; the second highest is Yemen with 52.8 firearms per 100 people.

A study published in PLOS One in 2015 examined mass shootings in the U.S. from 2005 to 2013 (and school shootings in the U.S. from 1998 to 2013). The study authors found that the "state prevalence of firearm ownership is significantly associated with the state incidence of mass killings with firearms, school shootings, and mass shootings."

Conversely, the October 2018 PLOS One study used a Bayesian zero-inflated Poisson regression model to assess the impact of state-level gun ownership rates in predicting state-level mass shooting rates (with state-level SMI rates, state-level poverty rates, and state-level population sizes as covariates) that found that state-level gun ownership rates were not statistically significantly associated with the number of mass shootings in each state. The Bayesian zero-inflated Poisson regression model had a better goodness of fit value based upon deviance information criterion than a Bayesian Poisson regression model (which were 102.5 to 145.7 respectively). The researchers then tested the possibility that the relationship between gun ownership and the mass shooting rate was being confounded by gun law permissiveness using the Bayesian zero-inflated Poisson regression model and found that gun law permissiveness was only nominally correlated with gun ownership and that gun ownership was not statistically associated with the mass shooting rate with or without gun law permissiveness being adjusted in the model.

A 2019 study published in The BMJ conducted a cross-sectional time series study of U.S. states from 1998 to 2015; the study found that "States with more permissive gun laws and greater gun ownership had higher rates of mass shootings, and a growing divide appears to be emerging between restrictive and permissive states." The study specifically found that "A 10% increase in state gun ownership was associated with a significant 35.1% (12.7% to 62.7%, P=0.001) higher rate of mass shootings. Partially adjusted regression analyses produced similar results, as did analyses restricted to domestic and non-domestic mass shootings."

A 2020 study published in Law and Human Behavior examined the relationship of state guns laws and the incidence and lethality of mass shootings in the U.S. from 1976 to 2018.The study found that "laws requiring permits to purchase a gun are associated with a lower incidence of mass public shootings, and bans on large capacity magazines are associated with fewer fatalities and nonfatal injuries when such events do occur." The study specifically found that large-capacity magazine bans were associated with approximately 38% fewer fatalities and 77% fewer nonfatal injuries when a mass shooting occurred.

The American Psychiatric Association has endorsed assault weapons bans, high-capacity magazine bans, and universal background checks as a way to curb gun violence in the U.S.

Perpetrator mental health

A panel of mental health and law enforcement experts has estimated that roughly one-third of acts of mass violence—defined as crimes in which four or more people were killed—since the 1990s were committed by people with a "serious mental illness" (SMI). However, the study emphasized that people with an SMI are responsible for less than 4% of all the violent acts committed in the United States. The American Psychiatric Association (APA) states that gun violence is a public health crisis and has repeatedly noted that the overwhelming majority of people with mental illness are not violent and "are far more likely to be victims of violent crime than perpetrators of violence." The APA has endorsed red flag laws to remove firearm access from people at high risk of committing acts of violence.

In February 2021, Psychological Medicine published a survey reviewing 14,785 publicly reported murders in English language news worldwide between 1900 and 2019 compiled in a database by psychiatrists at the New York State Psychiatric Institute and the Columbia University Irving Medical Center which found that of the 1,315 personal-cause mass murders (i.e. driven by personal motivations and not occurring within the context of war, state-sponsored or group-sponsored terrorism, gang activity, or organized crime) only 11 percent of mass murderers and only 8 percent of mass shooters had an SMI (e.g. schizophrenia, bipolar disorder, major depressive disorder), that mass shootings have become more common than other forms of mass murder since 1970 (with 73 percent occurring in the United States alone), and that mass shooters in the United States were more likely to have legal histories, to engage in recreational drug use or alcohol abuse, and to display non-psychotic psychiatric or neurologic symptoms.

In 2018, the FBI Behavioral Analysis Unit released a survey of 63 active shooter cases between 2000 and 2013 that found that while 62 percent of active shooters showed symptoms of mental health disorders, those symptoms may have been "transient manifestations of behaviors and moods that would not be sufficient to warrant a formal diagnosis of mental illness", and that only one-fourth of active shooters surveyed had a formal diagnosis of any mental health disorder (and a psychotic disorder in only 3 cases). The survey concludes that given the high lifetime prevalence of the symptoms of mental illness among the U.S. population, "formally diagnosed mental illness is not a very specific predictor of violence of any type, let alone targeted violence." Psychiatrist Ronald W. Pies has suggested that psychopathology should be understood as a three-gradation continuum of mental, behavioral and emotional disturbance with most mass shooters falling into a middle category of "persistent emotional disturbance."

In May 2022, Psychology, Public Policy, and Law published a survey of 172 mass shooters coded on 166 life history variables conducted by Jillian Peterson, sociologist James Densley (Peterson's co-founder of The Violence Project's database), and criminologists Kyle Knapp, Stasia Higgins, and Amanda Jensen that found that symptoms of psychosis played no role in 69 percent of mass shootings. In the October 2018 PLOS One study, the Bayesian zero-inflated Poisson regression model that included state-level SMI rates as a covariate to predict state-level mass shooting rates found that state-level SMI rates did not predict state-level mass shooting rates. In 2004, the U.S. Secret Service and the U.S. Department of Education issued a report analyzing 41 school shootings in the United States that found that 78 percent of the shooters surveyed had histories of suicidal ideation or attempted suicide. In its 2014 active shooter incidents review, the FBI found that 96 of the 160 incidents (60%) ended before police arrived, and in 64 incidents (40%) the shooter committed suicide.

In December 2021, the Journal of Threat Assessment and Management published a study comparing 171 public mass shooters and 63 active shooters in the United States from 1966 to 2019 (using cases compiled in The Violence Project's database) to the general population, homicide offenders, and people who die by suicide. In comparison to the general population, mass shooters were more likely to have a history of mental health issues, to have lifetime thought disorders, and greater lifetime suicidal ideation, while in comparison to general homicide offenders, mass shooters four times more frequently premeditated their homicides, eight times more frequently killed strangers, and were more likely to experience suicidal ideation and commit suicide directly or by cop. In comparison to people who committed suicide, mass shooters were actually more likely to have histories of suicidal ideation and were slightly more likely to premeditate the act. However, like the APA, the researchers emphasized that having a formal mental health disorder diagnosis is more predictive of being a victim of violence rather than a perpetrator. In the December 2013 Journal of Forensic Sciences lone-actor terrorists survey, lone-actor attacks were rarely sudden or impulsive and the researchers have subsequently noted that a sizable subset of their subjects took preparations to maximize their chances of death by cop or suicide.

Based upon the similarities in premeditation and lifetime suicidal ideation, James Densley has argued, "Many of these mass shootings are angry suicides." Jillian Peterson et al., in a cross-sectional study published in JAMA Network Open examining 170 perpetrators of mass public shootings from 1996 to 2019, found that 44.3% of mass shooters had leaked their plans prior to committing the act, and that "Leakage was associated with receiving counseling and suicidality, which suggests it may be best characterized as a cry for help from perpetrators prior to their act." Peterson wrote: "These findings suggest that leakage is a critical moment for mental health intervention to prevent gun violence."

Sociocultural factors and perpetrator life histories 

In 2015, psychiatrists James L. Knoll and George D. Annas noted that considering that mass shootings committed by perpetrators with SMIs amount to less than 1 percent of all gun-related homicides (and that most gun deaths in the United States are suicides rather than homicides), the tendency of most media attention following mass shootings on mental health leads to sociocultural factors being comparatively overlooked. Instead, Knoll and Annas cite research by social psychologists Jean Twenge and W. Keith Campbell on narcissism and social rejection in the personal histories of mass shooters, as well as cognitive scientist Steven Pinker's suggestion in The Better Angels of Our Nature (2011) that further reductions in human violence may be dependent upon reducing human narcissism.

Psychiatrist Paul S. Appelbaum argued that the data from the New York State Psychiatric Institute and Columbia University Irving Medical Center database of mass shootings show that "legal problems, substance and alcohol use, and difficulty coping with life events seem more useful foci for prevention [of mass shootings] and policy than an emphasis on serious mental illness." In the December 2021 Journal of Threat Assessment and Management study, mass shooters were more likely to be unemployed and be unmarried in comparison to the general population, while in comparison to general homicide offenders, mass shooters were more likely to not be in an intimate relationship. In the December 2013 Journal of Forensic Sciences lone-actor terrorists survey, a wide range of activities and experiences preceded lone actors attacks, many but not all lone-actors were socially isolated, lone-actors regularly engaged in a detectable and observable range of activities with a wider pressure group, social movement, or terrorist organization, and a subset of 106 subjects for whom relationship data was available found that 68.9 percent had never married or were divorced or separated from their spouse and only 27.7 percent were reported to have children. British criminologist Peter Squires argued that mass shooters in Europe and the U.S. "tend to be loners with not much social support who strike out at their communities, schools and families", and noted that countries with high gun-ownership rates but greater social capital (such as Norway, Finland, Switzerland, and Israel) have fewer mass killings.

In the first edition of Bowling Alone (2000), political scientist Robert D. Putnam found that social capital in the United States sharply declined beginning in the 1960s, and that this was caused primarily by the expansion of television ownership by U.S. households (which grew from an ownership rate of 1 percent in 1948 to 75 percent by 1955), the gradual replacement of the Greatest Generation and Silent Generation birth year cohorts by the Baby boomer and Generation X birth year cohorts, and the effect of the television ownership expansion on Baby boomers and Generation X. In the afterword to the second edition of Bowling Alone (2020), Putnam found that the expansion of internet access, social media, social networking services, professional network services, and e-commerce was probably accelerating the decline in social capital among the U.S. population, while mostly just reinforcing existing social connections rather than creating new ones—analogously to the effect that the expansion of telephone ownership by U.S. households had (which grew from an ownership rate of 1 percent in 1890 to a majority by 1946 and to 75 percent by 1957). In 2000, a majority of U.S. households owned at least one personal computer and had internet access the following year. In 2002, a majority of U.S. survey respondents reported having a mobile phone, and in January 2013, a majority of U.S. survey respondents reported owning a smartphone.

Putnam noted that during the latter half of the 20th century, the suicide rate rose among Baby boomers and Generation X while it declined among the Greatest Generation and the Silent Generation. In 2018, the National Center for Health Statistics of the Centers for Disease Control and Prevention released studies that found that the suicide rate in the United States as a whole had risen by 30 percent from 2000 to 2016, that the suicide rate in every single state had increased during the same period (with half of the states seeing increases greater than 30 percent), and that the rising suicide rate was partially responsible for estimates of life expectancy in the United States to decline for the second time in three years. In 1994, evolutionary biologist George C. Williams and evolutionary psychiatrist Randolph M. Nesse argued that mass communications in general, and television in particular, were dissolving supportive intimate social networks and likely causing higher rates of depression and suicide especially among younger people. Citing Suicide: A Study in Sociology (1897) by Émile Durkheim, economists Anne Case and Angus Deaton note that the United States is an outlier among countries with its rising suicide rate since 2000 (along with other deaths of despair), while social psychologist Jonathan Haidt has argued that contemporary research about suicide and happiness has vindicated Durkheim's research about social disconnectedness causing higher suicide rates.

Psychologist Jillian Peterson and James Densley, co-founded The Violence Project, a National Institute of Justice-funded project in which researchers studied approximately 150 mass shooters and coded 50 life history variables for each. Their data suggest that almost all mass shooting perpetrators had four life history variables in common: they had (1) commonly experienced early childhood trauma and exposure to violence; (2) "reached an identifiable crisis point in the weeks or months leading up to the shooting," often linked to a specific grievance; (3) researched previous mass shootings, with many being radicalized through the internet; and (4) obtained the means (firearms) to carry out the plan, with perpetrators obtaining weapons from family members in 80% of school shootings, workplace shooters tending to use legally owned handguns, and other public shooters being more likely to acquire firearms illegally. The Violence Project's comprehensive mass shooting database also showed that mass shootings tend to occur in clusters, that mass shooters share a sense of entitlement and seek scapegoats when they fail to achieve goals in life, and that hate-motivated and fame-seeking mass shootings have increased since 2015. A 2021 article in the journal Injury Epidemiology found that from 2014 to 2019, 59.1% of mass shootings in the United States were related to domestic violence (DV), and the shooter either killed a family member or had a DV history in 68.2% of mass shootings.

Mass shooting contagion (the "copycat phenomenon") has been studied. A study published in PLOS One in 2015 examined mass shootings in the U.S. from 2005 to 2013 (and school shootings in the U.S. from 1998 to 2013). The study authors found that "significant evidence that mass killings involving firearms are incentivized by similar events in the immediate past," concluding that: "On average, this temporary increase in probability lasts 13 days, and each incident incites at least 0.30 new incidents (p = 0.0015). We also find significant evidence of contagion in school shootings, for which an incident is contagious for an average of 13 days and incites an average of at least 0.22 new incidents (p = 0.0001)."

In the October 2018 PLOS One study, the Bayesian zero-inflated Poisson regression model that included state-level poverty rates and state-level population sizes as covariates to predict state-level mass shooting rates found that state-level poverty rates and state-level population sizes did not predict state-level mass shooting rates. However, the researchers also used a Poisson regression model to test if the frequency of online media coverage density and online search interest levels correlated with shorter intervals between any two consecutive incidents. Due to the distributions of online media coverage density being highly skewed, the researchers first performed a logarithmic transformation on the media coverage variable and adjusted for numbers of fatalities and injuries (which the researchers also did for online search interest). The researchers then applied a pairwise correlation analysis on online media coverage, online search interest levels, and mass shootings and found that both online indices significantly inversely correlated with the time interval between consecutive incidents (i.e. that greater online media posts and online searches correlated with shorter time intervals between incidents and vice versa). The researchers concluded that their findings suggest that online media might correlate with an increasing incidence rate of mass shootings. Steven Pinker has also noted that much of the news media in the United States has an editorial policy of "if it bleeds, it leads".

Other posited factors contributing to the prevalence of mass shootings include perpetrators' desire to seek revenge for perceived school or workplace bullying, the widespread chronic gap between people's expectations for themselves and their actual achievement, perpetrators' desire for fame and notoriety, toxic masculinity (mass shootings are perpetrated almost exclusively by men and boys), and a failure of government background checks due to incomplete databases and/or staff shortages. Feminist activist and psychotherapist Harriet Fraad and Marxian economist Richard D. Wolff contend that "American hyper-capitalism" fosters loneliness and social alienation among American men who become mass shooters.

Weapons used
Several types of guns have been used in mass shootings in the United States, including semi-automatic handguns, semi-automatic rifles, revolvers, and shotguns. Of the 172 events from 1966 to 2019 classified as mass public shootings (four or more victims killed) in the U.S. by the 2022 National Institute of Justice/The Violence Project dataset, perpetrators used handguns in 77.2% of cases and semi-automatic rifles in 25.1% of cases. An earlier 2016 study by James Alan Fox and Emma E. Fridel similarly concluded that "rather than assault weapons, semiautomatic handguns are the weapons of choice for most mass shooters." High-capacity magazines were used in more than half of mass shootings over the four decades up to 2018. From 1966 to 2019, approximately 77% of mass shooters in the U.S. legally obtained the firearm used in the attacks. Although semi-automatic rifles are used in only 1% of overall shootings in the U.S., they are used in 25% of mass shootings, and (as of 2018) in six of the ten deadliest mass shooting events.

Effects

Political

A British Journal of Political Science study first published in 2017 (and in print in 2019) found that increase in proximity to mass public shootings in the U.S. was associated with statistically significant and "substantively meaningful" increases in support for stricter gun control laws. The study also found that repeated events, magnitude, and recency of mass shootings play a role with "proximity to repeated events, more horrific events and more recent events" increasing "the salience of gun violence, and thus ... support for gun control." However, the study found that the "most powerful effects" in support or opposition to gun control "are driven by variables related to local culture, with pronounced but expected differences emerging between respondents in rural, conservative, and gun-heavy areas and those residing in urban, liberal areas with few firearm stores." A separate 2019 replication study, extending the earlier panel analysis, found no evidence that mass shootings caused a "significant or substantively meaningful main effect" on attitudes toward gun control. However, the study did find evidence that mass shootings "have polarizing effects conditional on partisanship": "That is, Democrats who live near a mass shooting even tend to become more supportive of gun control restrictions, while Republican attitudes shift in the opposite direction." The study authors concluded, "To the extent that mass shootings may affect public opinion, the result is polarizing rather than consensus building."

A 2020 study published in the American Political Science Review using data on school shootings from 2006 to 2018 concluded the incidents had "little to no effect on electoral outcomes in the United States," whereas a 2021 study in the same journal covering a broader time period (1980–2016) found that the vote share of the Democratic Party increased by an average of almost 5 percentage points in counties that had experienced a "rampage-style" school shooting. Both studies found no increase in voter turnout.

A 2021 study published in PNAS concluded that "mass shootings have a strong impact on the emotions of individuals, but the impact is politicized, limited to individuals living within the town or city where the incident occurs, and fades within a week of the incident." The study authors suggested that this phenomenon could help explain why mass shootings in the U.S. have not led to meaningful policy reform efforts.

Public health
A review article first published online in 2015 and then printed in January 2017 in the journal Trauma, Violence, & Abuse concluded that "mass shootings are associated with a variety of adverse psychological outcomes in survivors and members of affected communities" and that while "the psychological effects of mass shootings on indirectly exposed populations" is less well-understood, "there is evidence that such events lead to at least short-term increases in fears and declines in perceived safety." Identified risk factors for adverse psychological outcomes have included, among others, demographics, greater proximity to the attack, acquaintance with victims, and less access to psychosocial resources.

Deadliest mass shootings since 1949

The following mass shootings are the deadliest to have occurred in modern U.S. history. Only incidents with ten or more fatalities by gunshots, excluding those of the perpetrators, are included. This list starts in 1949, the year in which Howard Unruh committed his shooting, which was the first in modern U.S. history to incur ten or more fatalities.

 Was previously the deadliest mass shooting

See also

 List of school massacres by death toll
 Gun laws in the United States
 Gun laws in the United States by state
 Gun violence in the United States
 List of rampage killers in the United States
 School shootings in the United States
 Spree killer
 Public opinion on gun control in the United States

Explanatory notes

References

External links

 
 Most Comprehensive Mass Shooter Database—The Violence Project

 
Gun violence in the United States